Mokhtar Ahmad (31 August 1943 – 21 October 2006) was a politician from the Chittagong District of Bangladesh and an elected a member of parliament for Chittagong-12. He was an organizer of the Liberation War of Bangladesh.

Early life 
Mokhtar Ahmad was born on 31 August 1943 in the village of Ratakhord Mozaffarabad in the Sadhanpur union of Banshkhali in Chittagong district.

Career 
Mokhtar joined politics in 1962. He was a freedom fighter. In Sector 1, he was the regional captain of Banshkhali, Anwara and Kutubdia.

He was elected to parliament from Chittagong-12 as a Jatiya Samajtantrik Dal candidate in 1988. He was defeated as the candidate of Jatiya Samajtantrik Dal from Chittagong-15 constituency in the first parliamentary elections of 1973.

In 1992 he rejoined the Bangladesh Awami League and served as a member of the Chittagong South District.

Death 
Mokhtar Ahmad died on 21 October 2006.

References 

1943 births
2006 deaths
People from Banshkhali Upazila
Awami League politicians
4th Jatiya Sangsad members